Kostakis Konstantinou (born 24 September 1968) is a retired Cypriot footballer who played as a defender, and was capped 35 times by the Cyprus national football team, scoring one goal.

Career
Konstantinou played for four of the biggest clubs in Cyprus: AEL Limassol, AC Omonia, Apollon Limassol and APOEL F.C. In the 1997/98 season he played for English fourth-tier side Barnet, but only made one appearance, being substituted after 63 minutes against Cardiff City on 12 October 1996.

His son Alex Konstantinou is also a professional footballer and, like his father, has played football in England and for Apollon Limassol. He has been capped by Cyprus U-21s.

References

1968 births
Living people
Association football defenders
Cypriot footballers
Cyprus international footballers
Greek Cypriot people
AEL Limassol players
AC Omonia players
Apollon Limassol FC players
Barnet F.C. players
APOEL FC players
English Football League players
Cypriot expatriate footballers
Expatriate footballers in England
Cypriot expatriate sportspeople in England
Sportspeople from Limassol